Fuzati (born in 1978) is a French rapper originating from Versailles. He was co-founder in 2000 of Klub des Loosers.

Always wearing a mask, he is known for his sad, cynical lyrics.

Career
Fuzati studied communications law and worked as a journalist in Clark magazine before engaging in musical career as an MC and co-founder.

Klub des Loosers

Fuzati was co-founder in 2000 of the musical project Klub des Loosers as a duo with Orgasmic known as DJ Orgasmic le Toxicologue acting as producer.

When Orgasmic left Klub des Loosers to join TTC, DJ Detect joined as long-time partner of the duo Klub des Loosers.

Other collaborations
Fuzati collaborated with Teki Latex, a member of TTC in the program Grek'frites on Canalweb between 1999 and 2001.

Fuzati also took part in other side projects notably in L'Atelier with the likes of Teki Latex, Cyanure (of ATK), James Delleck and Tacteel (who were working as a DJ duo as FuckALoop) and Para One (DJ in the formation TTC). L'Atelier released the album Buffet des anciens élèves and Thé dansant des anciens élèves both in 2003.

In a separate link, Fuzati also collaborated with Jean-Benoît Dunckel, of the group Air in 2004.

Le Klub des 7

Fuzati continued with releasing Klub des Loosers materials and organized formation of a rap collective under the emblem Le Klub de 7 with invitation to known rappers and hip hop artists from various groups. The "seven" were: James Delleck and Le Jouage (from Gravité Zéro project), Gérard Baste (of Svinkels), Cyanure and Fredy K (of the collective ATK) and Detect (his partner in Klub des Loosers).

Many had already participated in a successful joint release in 2003 titled Baise Les Gens that had been credited to Fuzati, Teki Latex, James Delleck, Cyanure, Tacteel and Para One on cover. In 2007, as the collective formalized as Le Klub des 7, they released the albums  Le Klub des 7 as a self-titled album soon after which, Fredy K (part of the "seven") died in a motorcycle accident on 7 November 2007. The collective had one follow-up album La Classe de Musique in 2009 before parting ways.

Orgasmic and Fuzati

In 2013, Fuzati announced formation of a duo collaboration with his original Loosers partner Orgasmic in Orgasmic & Fuzati resulting in the 2014 album Grand siècle and single release "Planetarium".

Discography
in L'Atelier
2003: Buffet des anciens élèves

as Klub des Loosers

Others
2003: La femme de fer [two releases, CD and 12" vynil]
2004: Sous le signe du V [Vinyl 12"]
2005: AM704 [7" vinyl]
2005: Radio Show Vol. 1 [CD]
2008-2012: Broadcast Sessions [CD]
2008: Vol. 1
2008: Vol. 1
2010: Vol. 3
2012: Vol. 4
2010: Spring Tales [CD] (Klub Records)
2012: Spring Tales (release) [CD / LP] (Corso Fleuri editions)
2013: Last Days [CD / LP]

in Le Klub de 7
2003: Baise Les Gens [credited to Fuzati, Teki Latex, James Delleck, Cyanure, Tacteel, Para One - CD and 12" vinyl) 
2006: Le Klub des 7 (credited to Le Klub de 7, Vicious Circle Records)
2009: La Classe de Musique'' - (Le Klub de 7, two releases - as EP and as an album) (Encore Records)

as Orgasmic and Fuzati

References

French rappers
Living people
People from Versailles
Masked musicians
Year of birth missing (living people)